Mercury fluoride can refer to:

 Mercury(I) fluoride (dimercury difluoride, mercury monofluoride, mercurous fluoride), Hg2F2
 Mercury(II) fluoride (mercury difluoride, mercuric fluoride), HgF2
 Mercury(IV) fluoride (mercury tetrafluoride, permercuric fluoride), HgF4

Gallery